The 1988–89 FIS Cross-Country World Cup was the 8th official World Cup season in cross-country skiing for men and women. The Women's World Cup started in La Clusaz, France, on 10 December 1988 and finished in Falun, Sweden, on 12 March 1989. The Men's World Cup started in Ramsau, Austria on 10 December 1988 and finished in Falun, Sweden, on 12 March 1989.Gunde Svan of Sweden won the overall men's cup, his fifth title, and Yelena Välbe of the Soviet Union won the women's cup.

Calendar

Men

Women

Men's team events

Women's team events

Overall standings

Men's standings

Women's standings

Medal table

Achievements
First World Cup career victory

Men
  Vegard Ulvang, 25, in his 6th season – the WC 4 (15 km C) in Kavgolovo; first podium was 1985–86 WC 4 (5 km F) in Bohinj 
  Lars Håland, 26, in his 4th season – the WC 12 (30 km F) in Falun; first podium was 1988–89 WC 8 (15 km F) in Lahti 

Women
  Alžbeta Havrančíková, 25, in her 6th season – the WC 1 (5 km F) in La Féclaz; also first podium
  Yelena Välbe, 20, in her 2nd season – the WC 2 (15 km F) in Campra; first podium was 1988–89 WC 1 (5 km F) in La Féclaz
  Yuliya Shamshurina, 26, in her 4th season – the WC 3 (10 km C) in Davos; also first podium

Victories in this World Cup (all-time number of victories as of 1988–89 season in parentheses)

Men
 , 6 (26) first places
 , 2 (2) first places
 , 1 (7) first place
 , 1 (3) first place
 , 1 (3) first place
 , 1 (1) first place

Women
 , 5 (5) first places
 , 2 (10) first places
 , 2 (2) first places
 , 1 (8) first place
 , 1 (4) first place
 , 1 (1) first place

See also
Johann Mühlegg

References

FIS Cross-Country World Cup seasons
World Cup 1988-89
World Cup 1988-89